A Goniophotometer is a device used for measurement of the light emitted from an object at different angles. The use of goniophotometers has been increasing in recent years with the introduction of LED-light sources, which are mostly directed light sources, where the spatial distribution of light is not homogeneous. If a light source is homogeneous in its distribution of light, it is called a Lambertian source. Due to strict regulations, the spatial distribution of light is of high importance to automotive lighting and its design.

Uses
A goniophotometer can be used for various applications:
 Measurement of luminous flux of a light source
 Measurement of luminous intensity distribution from a source much smaller than the size of the goniophotometer 
Equipped with color sensors additional characteristics can be measured
 Distribution of correlated color temperature  
 Color uniformity

Types
The various types of goniophotometer are defined here which is derive from publication "CIE 70" from the International Commission on Illumination.

Type A
Fixed horizontal axis, with the vertical axis attached, both perpendicular to the main output direction of the light source

Type B
Fixed vertical axis, with the horizontal axis attached, both perpendicular to the main output direction of the light source

Type A and B are Double columns structure. This type is applied to fixed the grille lamp. The symmetry axis of lamp and the horizontal of rotating supporter is coaxial, in the B-βcoordinate system, and the two is vertical Cross, in the A-αcoordinate system.

Type C
Fixed vertical axis perpendicular to the line of measurement, with a horizontal axis parallel to the main output direction of the light source

Type C are single column structures. The single column structure is created when the assistant column is taken down from double columns structure. This type is applied to a fixed tube lamp, spot lamp, or other devices. The axis radiation of lamp and the horizontal of rotating supporter is coaxial.

See also
 Integrating sphere
 Goniometer
 Goniophotometry
 EULUMDAT

References

Photometry